Atriplectididae is a family of caddisflies belonging to the order Trichoptera.

Genera:
 Atriplectides Mosely, 1936 
 Hughscottiella Ulmer, 1910 
 Leptodermatopteryx Ulmer, 1910 
 Neoatriplectides Holzenthal, 1997

References

Trichoptera
Trichoptera families